Noel I. Aparilla (born December 17, 1968), commonly known by the screen name Leon Miguel is a Filipino actor, model, and engineer. He recently bagged the Best Actor (Short) award from the International Film Festival Manhattan (IFFM) 2016 in New York City, USA for his performance in Redlights. Earlier, he gained world-wide attention and notoriety for his role as the leading villain, Visel, in a Tribeca film crime-thriller entry, Graceland: A Life for Every Lie (2012) directed by Ron Morales. Graceland's premiere in the Tribeca Film Festival mesmerized audiences in the 2012 festival and was awarded Second Place in Audience Choice Award. Graceland also had its Canadian premiere in the Fantasia International Film Festival in July 2012 in Montreal, Canada and it also won Audience Award at the Gasparilla Film Festival in Tampa, Florida.

Some of the latest works that has caught the attention of  international film festivals is Leon Miguel's starring role in Mang Abe's Ube, a modern-day folktale about a Filipino ube farmer trying to protect his magical source of success from corporate crooks, directed by Paolo Bitanga. Leon Miguel is currently premiering "EJK" (Extra-Judicial Killing), a timely and political film narrative by Red Carpet Philippines at Greenbelt 1, Cinema 2, Ayala Center, Makati.

Leon Miguel was featured in the November 2014 issue of Manila Bulletin titled "International filmfest veteran is proudly from Masbate".

Early career
In a span of a little over a decade, Leon Miguel's career in the entertainment world was more than the typical story of an artist struggling to survive. He was into films, theatre, television shows and television commercial ads, practically accepting every possible role that he can get his hands into concentrating rather intently in sharpening his skills as an actor and learning the ropes and nuances of the industry.

He broke into international scenes through movies and television presentations appearing in American, Japanese and Italian movies shot in the Philippines.  Such American movies were: In the Name of the Queen (1996) of NCRV/TEWES Production and directed by Bram Van Erkel, portraying the “Djahat Warrior” (Indonesian); Behind Enemy Lines (1998) of Philippine Film Studio, Inc. (PFSI) and directed by Mark Griffiths, playing as the “Vietnamese Gangster Leader;” Legacy (1998) of Star Pacific International Productions and directed by T.J. Scott, doing the role of a “Cambodian Rebel Leader,” together with David Hasselhoff and Rod Steiger; and Going Back (2000), of GFT Films, Inc. and directed by Sydney Furie, portraying as the “Vietnamese Thief,” together with the lead actor, Casper Van Dien.

Exotic Asian roles
Leon Miguel was remarked by many, to have an exotic Asian face and notable acting fitted for various Asian and native roles, which made him greatly preferred by international directors and producers. He was involved in various notable Filipino films. Among the local films were, Mulanay Sa Pusod Ng Paraiso (1996) directed by Gil Portes, Kamada (1997) directed by Raymond Red, and My Guardian Debil (1998). He appeared in Ara Mina's Nag-Aapoy Na Laman (2000) as “Chupon,” directed by Don Escudero, as well as in Bala Ko Ang Bahala Sa Iyo (2001), Rosario 18 (2001), Utang Ni Tatang (2002), Batas Ng Lansangan (2002), Bakat (2002), Lapu-Lapu (2002), Operation Balikatan (2003) and Paraiso (2005), where he did distinctive roles such as: kanto boy (Street Toughie), siga (Toughie), syndicate member, school worker, youngster’s hoodlum, snatcher, hitman, rapist, bangkero (boatman), and rebel roles (Katipunero, Hukbalahap).

He was the guerilla named “Juan” in Concerto (2008), a Cinemalaya finalist directed by Paul Alexander Morales; as well as portrayed “Lobo” in Panahon Na (2009) and “Farmer” in Pendong (2010), both directed by Sean Lim and under Oxin Films. Further, he was a “Gangster,” in Third World Happy (2010) with Sam Milby as the lead actor, of CinemaOne/Brass Knuckers Inc., under the direction of Edward James Salcedo; the “Rebel” in CinemaOne Originals, Tsardyer (2010) directed by Sigfried Barros-Sanchez; and depicted the role of “Baloy” in Isda (Fable of the Fish) 2011 Cinemalaya entry, directed by Adolf Alix, Jr. In July 2012, he portrayed as Guerilla (Filipino soldier) in Death March, another film directed by Adolf Alix, Jr.

Television commercials
Leon Miguel also did several television commercial advertising as a Katipunero in KKK (Andres Bonifacio) (1998), and Isang Bandilla (Emilio Aguinaldo) (1998) for the Philippine Centennial Celebration. He was also the lead actor Katipunero in the Duty Free Centennial Presentation (2010) directed by Raymond Red. He also appeared in San Miguel Beer (2004), SMB Vietnam Setting commercial, Metro Bank (2004), Blend 45 (2005), SMB Walng Kupas (2005), Oracle (2006) and Touch Mobile (2008). He as well portrayed as a Chavacano Fisherman, in an intrusion project of GMA Channel 7 and Globe Company, in the music video Believe used as a Station ID for the Peace and Unity information-dissemination drive.

He was also featured in a Talk & Text (Hati) (2010) commercial, Snitch Choco Bar (Rockers Dream) (2010), Head & Shoulders (2010), Project Building Medicine TVC (2010), and Ayos Dito Rocker TVC.

Filmography

Film

Commercials

Television

Theater

References

External links

1968 births
Filipino male television actors
Living people
People from Masbate
Filipino male film actors